Bhalo Theko (Take Care) is a 2003 Indian Bengali movie based on Leena Gangopadhaya's story Janmadin released in 2003. Directed by Goutam Halder, it featured Soumitra Chatterjee, Joy Sengupta, Debshankar Halder, Parambrata Chatterjee and Vidya Balan. This movie marks Vidya Balan's cinematic debut. At the 51st National Film Awards, the film was awarded for Best Cinematography, Best Audiography and Special Jury Award for films producer and director.

Plot 
The film is set in Acharya Jagadish Chandra Bose's home in Falta, West Bengal, masquerading as Uttarpara. It deals with the story of a girl Anandi and her family (including uncle, brother, parents and sister), lover (brother's friend Babua) and few neighbours. Nature, tradition and love are Anandi's pillars of support in difficult times. Her brother will slowly drift away with companies of Naxalites, will not return home one day, and will be lost forever. Her parents will die heartbroken and her sister will get married suddenly and will leave the family. Babua will go abroad and marry somebody else.

It is implied that Anandi is forgetful of her sorrows that she was deceived by Babua (Joy Sengupta) whom she loved most. Babua comes back from abroad only to say: 'Anandi, I came back to set you free.'

Bhalo Theko has a non-linear pace with frequent jumps between current time and past. Film critics described Anandi as a large canvas painted in several hues. She stands against rootless internalisation and perplexed culture. A poem by a renowned Bangladeshi author and scholar Humayun Azad named "Shuvescha" was recited in the ending of the film by Anandi while wandering lonely in their garden.

Cast 
Vidya Balan as Anandi
Soumitra Chatterjee as Anandi's uncle
Joy Sengupta as Babua shine
Debshankar Haldar
Parambrata Chatterjee
Rimjhim Gupta
Souvik Poyra
Anusua Majumdar
Bijay Lakshmi Barman
Chandan Sengupta

Promotion 

Bhalo Theko was screened at the Bangkok film festival, 2004.

References

External links

2003 films
Bengali-language Indian films
Films whose cinematographer won the Best Cinematography National Film Award
Films set in West Bengal
Films based on short fiction
Films that won the Best Audiography National Film Award
Special Jury Award (feature film) National Film Award winners
2003 directorial debut films
2000s Bengali-language films